The Mescal Range is a small mountain range in the eastern Mojave Desert in California about 12 miles from the Nevada state line.

The range lies just to the south of Interstate 15 near Mountain Pass. The Clark Mountain Range lies to the north. It lies northwest of the Ivanpah Mountains across Paiute Valley. To the west is the broad Shadow Valley. The mountains are approximately six miles long. Mines in the range include the Mollusk, Blue Buzzard and Iron Horse mines along the eastern end.

References

Mountain ranges of Southern California
Mountain ranges of the Mojave Desert
Mountain ranges of San Bernardino County, California